Srirangam railway station is an important railway station in Tiruchirappalli, Tamil Nadu. Its code is SRGM. It serves the vicinity of Srirangam Area and pilgrims visiting Ranganathaswamy Temple. The station consists of four well sheltered platforms.

References 

Railway stations in Tiruchirappalli